In enzymology, a 3-hydroxy-16-methoxy-2,3-dihydrotabersonine N-methyltransferase is an enzyme that catalyzes the chemical reaction

S-adenosyl-L-methionine + 3-hydroxy-16-methoxy-2,3-dihydrotabersonine  S-adenosyl-L-homocysteine + deacetoxyvindoline

Thus, the two substrates of this enzyme are S-adenosyl methionine and 3-hydroxy-16-methoxy-2,3-dihydrotabersonine, whereas its two products are S-adenosylhomocysteine and deacetoxyvindoline.

This enzyme belongs to the family of transferases, specifically those transferring one-carbon group methyltransferases.  The systematic name of this enzyme class is S-adenosyl-L-methionine:3-hydroxy-16-methoxy-2,3-dihydrotabersonine N-methyltransferase. Other names in common use include 16-methoxy-2,3-dihydro-3-hydroxytabersonine methyltransferase, NMT, 16-methoxy-2,3-dihydro-3-hydroxytabersonine N-methyltransferase, S-adenosyl-L-methionine:16-methoxy-2,3-dihydro-3-hydroxytabersonine, and N-methyltransferase.  This enzyme participates in terpene indole and ipecac alkaloid biosynthesis.

References

 

EC 2.1.1
Enzymes of unknown structure